The 2020–21 Toledo Rockets men's basketball team represented the University of Toledo during the 2020–21 NCAA Division I men's basketball season. The Rockets, led by 11th-year head coach Tod Kowalczyk, played their home games at Savage Arena, as members of the West Division of the Mid-American Conference. In a season limited due to the ongoing COVID-19 pandemic, the Rockets finished the  season 21–9, 15–4 in MAC play to win MAC regular season championship. They defeated Ball State in the first round of the MAC tournament before losing to eventual tournament champions Ohio in the second round. They received an at-large bid to the National Invitation Tournament where they lost to Richmond in the first round.

Previous season
The Rockets finished the 2019–20 season 17–15, 8–10 in MAC play to finish third place in the West division. They defeated Western Michigan in the first round of the MAC tournament before the tournament and all subsequent postseason tournaments were canceled due to the COVID-19 pandemic.

Offseason

Departures

2020 recruiting class

Incoming transfers

Roster

Schedule and results

|-
!colspan=12 style=|Non-conference regular season

|-
!colspan=12 style=| MAC regular season
|-

|-
!colspan=9 style=| MAC tournament

|-
!colspan=9 style=| NIT

|-

References

Toledo
Toledo Rockets men's basketball seasons
Toledo